Schoharie County is a county in the U.S. state of New York. As of the 2020 census, the population was 29,714, making it the state's fifth-least populous county. The county seat is Schoharie. "Schoharie" comes from a Mohawk word meaning "floating driftwood." Schoharie County is part of the Albany-Schenectady-Troy, NY Metropolitan Statistical Area.

History

The large territory of the county (much of upstate and western New York) was long occupied by the Mohawk Nation and, to the west, the other four tribes of the Haudenosaunee Confederacy (increased to six with the migration of the Tuscarora from the South to New York in 1722). After European colonization of the Northeast started, the Mohawk had a lucrative fur trade with the French coming down from Canada, as well as the early Dutch colonists, and later British and German colonists.

Some Palatine Germans, who worked in camps on the Hudson to pay off their passage in 1710, later settled in this county in the 1720s and 30s. In addition, Scots-Irish immigrants settled in the present Schoharie County area before the American Revolutionary War, especially near Cherry Creek.

Political organization
After Great Britain defeated the Dutch and took over their colony in 1664, they began to establish counties in the New York territory in 1683. The present Schoharie County was first part of Albany County. This was an enormous county, including the northern part of New York State as well as all of the present State of Vermont. In theory, it extended westward to the Pacific Ocean, as the colonists wanted to keep their options open. This county was reduced in size on July 3, 1766, by the creation of Cumberland County, and further on March 16, 1770, by the creation of Gloucester County, both containing territory now part of Vermont.

On March 12, 1772, what was left of Albany County was split into three parts, one retaining the name Albany County. Tryon County was formed from the western portion of the territory (and thus, since no western boundary was specified, theoretically still extended west to the Pacific). The eastern boundary of Tryon County was approximately five miles west of the present city of Schenectady, and the county included the western part of the Adirondack Mountains and the area west of the West Branch of the Delaware River. The area then designated Tryon County was eventually organized into what are now 37 counties of New York State. The county was named for William Tryon, colonial governor of New York.

In the years preceding 1776, as social and political tensions rose in the colony, most of the Loyalists in Tryon County, then on the frontier, fled to Canada. In 1784, after the peace treaty that ended the Revolutionary War and the establishment of states, the new government changed Tryon County's name to Montgomery County to honor United States General Richard Montgomery, who had captured several places in Canada and died trying to capture the city of Quebec.

The state continued to organize new counties. In 1789, Montgomery County was reduced in size by the splitting off of Ontario County. It was originally much larger than the present county, including present-day Allegany, Cattaraugus, Chautauqua, Erie, Genesee, Livingston, Monroe, Niagara, Orleans, Steuben, Wyoming, Yates, and part of Schuyler and Wayne counties.

In 1791, Otsego County was one of three counties split off from Montgomery (the other two being Herkimer and Tioga County).

In 1795, Schoharie County was created by joining portions of Otsego and Albany counties.

Revolutionary War
This was an area of fighting during the American Revolutionary War. On the frontier, colonists were subject to raids by British and their Iroquois allies. Four of the six tribes allied with the British, hoping to repel the colonists from their territory.

Geography

Schoharie County is in central New York State, west of Albany and southeast of Utica.

Much of the southern portion of the county lies within the Catskill Mountains. Land rises in both directions quite rapidly from Schoharie Creek in the middle of the county. In contrast, the northern part of the county is predominately small hills and valleys. More than 75% of the county's population lives in the north, closer to the Mohawk River, the historic transportation route east and west through the state. Schoharie Creek is a northward-flowing tributary of the Mohawk River. The course of Schoharie Creek includes two reservoir-dam systems.

The Gilboa Dam and the Schoharie Reservoir are part of the New York City Water Supply System. The New York Power Authority operates the Blenheim-Gilboa Dam and its reservoir to produce hydroelectric power. The headwaters of the Delaware River are located in the Town of Jefferson. Tributaries of the Susquehanna River are located in the Towns of Jefferson and Summit.

The highest point is at the summit of Huntersfield Mountain on the southern boundary with Greene County, at 3,423 feet (1,043 m) above sea level. The lowest point is where the Montgomery County line meets Schoharie Creek, 520 feet (158 m) above sea level. The most prominent geological feature is Vroman's Nose, near the village of Middleburgh in the Town of Fulton.

Adjacent counties
 Albany County - east
 Delaware County - southwest
 Greene County - southeast
 Montgomery County - north
 Otsego County - west
 Schenectady County - northeast

Demographics

As of the census of 2000, there were 31,582 people, 11,991 households and 8,177 families residing in the county. The population density was 51 people per square mile (20/km2). There were 15,915 housing units at an average density of 26 per square mile (10/km2). The racial makeup of the county was 95.06% White, 2.14% Black or African American, 0.30% Native American, 0.49% Asian, 0.02% Pacific Islander, 0.36% from other races, and 0.93% from two or more races. 1.86% of the population were Hispanic or Latino of any race. 20.9% were of German, 15.6% Irish, 11.5% American, 10.8% Italian and 9.7% English ancestry according to Census 2000. 95.5% spoke English, 1.7% Spanish and 1.0% German as their first language.

There were 11,991 households, out of which 31.20% had children under the age of 18 living with them, 54.20% were married couples living together, 9.30% had a female householder with no husband present, and 31.80% were non-families. 25.80% of all households were made up of individuals, and 11.70% had someone living alone who was 65 years of age or older. The average household size was 2.49 and the average family size was 2.98.

In the county, the population was spread out, with 24.00% under the age of 18, 10.60% from 18 to 24, 26.20% from 25 to 44, 24.40% from 45 to 64, and 14.90% who were 65 years of age or older.  The median age was 38 years. For every 100 females there were 99.00 males.  For every 100 females age 18 and over, there were 97.80 males.

The median income for a household in the county was $36,585, and the median income for a family was $43,118. Males had a median income of $31,725 versus $24,475 for females. The per capita income for the county was $17,778. About 7.90% of families and 11.40% of the population were below the poverty line, including 13.70% of those under age 18 and 8.60% of those age 65 or over.

2020 Census

Economy
Schoharie County's primary industry is agriculture. Farms are situated all over the county and farm stands and other agriculture-related businesses are operated throughout the county.  Many residents work in the Capital District, New York. Walmart has a distribution center in the Village of Sharon Springs. The I-88 corridor is growing due to the short commute to Schenectady and Albany.

The Catskills-area villages have a number of historic hotels, as it was a vacation destination in the early 20th century. Second homes are common in the county.

A growing tourist industry attracts visitors for recreation, the landscape and historic destinations. Visitors come to Howe Caverns, Secret Caverns, the Bull's Head Inn restaurant and cellar tavern, the Carrot Barn, the Apple Barrel Country Store and Cafe, Vroman's Nose, the Old Stone Fort, and the Iroquois Indian Museum. The Old Blenheim Bridge was among the attractions until it was destroyed by Hurricane Irene in August 2011. Work to rebuild the covered bridge began in 2017.

Government
, Schoharie County is part of New York's 19th congressional district, represented by Democrat Pat Ryan; part of New York's 51st State Senate district, represented by Republican Peter Oberacker; and 
part of New York's 102nd Assembly district, represented by Republican Christopher Tague.

The sheriff of Schoharie County, Tony Desmond, received national attention for publicly stating during the 2013 election that he would not enforce the NY SAFE Act gun-control legislation. The current sheriff, Ronald R. Stevens, succeeded Desmond in 2018.

From 1884 to 1916, Schoharie County consistently backed Democratic Party candidates in presidential elections. Since 1916, the county has backed Democratic candidates only twice, in 1964 and 1996, when Lyndon B. Johnson and Bill Clinton dominated upstate New York.

|}

Communities

Towns

 Blenheim
 Broome
 Carlisle
 Cobleskill
 Conesville
 Esperance
 Fulton
 Gilboa
 Jefferson
 Middleburgh
 Richmondville
 Schoharie
 Seward
 Sharon
 Summit
 Wright

Villages
 Cobleskill
 Esperance
 Middleburgh
 Richmondville
 Schoharie (county seat)
 Sharon Springs

Census-designated places
 Central Bridge
 Jefferson
 North Blenheim

Other hamlets

 Breakabeen
 Charlotteville
 Esperance
 Fultonham
 Gallupville
 Grovenors Corners
 Livingstonville
 Sloansville
 Warnerville
 West Middleburgh

Transportation

Interstate and other major highways
Schoharie County is served by Interstate 88 paralleled by Route 7 as well as U.S. Route 20 in the north of the county running in the east-west direction. Route 30 and Route 10 run in the north-south direction in the county.

Mass Transit and Rail 
Bus service is provided by Schoharie Public Transportation with commuter routes to Albany as well as local and demand-responsive services. Passenger rail service was formerly provided by the Delaware and Hudson Railway on their Susquehanna Division until passenger service was discontinued in the 1960s. Today freight service continues along the Susquehanna Division provided by Norfolk Southern.

Notable sites
A prominent site in the county is the Old Stone Fort, used for defense against British and allied Indian attacks during the Revolution. It was later used as an armory during the Civil War.

During the 19th century, the Middleburgh-Schoharie Railroad was constructed through the county.

In 1981 the Iroquois Indian Museum opened in a new building near Howe Caverns in Cobleskill. It has the largest collection of Iroquois art in the United States and includes a performance center where Iroquois present traditional and contemporary music and dance.

The Gilboa Fossil Forest is home to one of the earth's oldest forests, with petrified tree trunks dating back over 380 million years to the Devonian period. Numerous fossils are on display at the Gilboa Museum near the Schoharie Reservoir.

Notable people
Notable people who were born or lived in Schoharie County include:
 Peter I. Borst, 1797–1848, U.S. representative from New York
 William C. Bouck, 1796–1859, former governor of New York 1843–1845
 John McGiver, 1913–1975, actor
 Timothy Murphy, 1751–1818, Revolutionary War sniper
 Nicole Sullivan, 1970–present, actress
 George Westinghouse, 1846–1914, engineer, inventor and entrepreneur
 Uriah Wood, 1830–1913, Wisconsin politician

In popular culture
 The novel Midnight's Lair (1983) by Richard Laymon was about explorers trapped in Howe Caverns.
 David Letterman, a late-night TV host, did a parody about the town of Schoharie.
 The two season reality series, The Fabulous Beekman Boys was set in Sharon Springs.
 In August 2010, the series Ghost Hunters filmed an episode about the Old Stone Fort; it aired December 8, 2010.
 A finalist on A Shot at Love with Tila Tequila took the show to the bowling alley in Cobleskill.
 The Boulder, Colorado Jam band String Cheese Incident mentions Schoharie County in the song 100 Year Flood.

See also

 Schoharie limousine crash
 List of counties in New York
 National Register of Historic Places listings in Schoharie County, New York

References

Further reading

External links
  Schoharie County Chamber of Commerce Official Site
 Schoharie County, New York official site
 Schoharie County official tourism site
  Early  history of Schoharie County
 Haunted History Trail Through Schoharie County
 
 "History of Schoharie", Jumping in Pools blog

 
Schoharie County, New York
Populated places established in 1795
Counties of Appalachia
1795 establishments in New York (state)
New York placenames of Native American origin